A general election was held in the state of Oklahoma on Tuesday, November 8, 2022. The primary election was held on Tuesday, June 28, 2022. Runoff primary elections, where necessary, were held on Tuesday, August 23. The candidate filing period was April 13, 2022 to April 15, 2022.

Oklahoma voters elected both of the state's U.S. Senators (Class II and Class III), the Governor of Oklahoma, the Lieutenant Governor of Oklahoma, the Attorney General of Oklahoma, the Oklahoma State Auditor and Inspector,  the Oklahoma State Superintendent of Public Instruction, the Oklahoma State Treasurer,   1 of the 3 Oklahoma Corporation Commissioners, the Oklahoma Commissioner of Labor, the Oklahoma Insurance Commissioner, all of its seats to the House of Representatives, all of the seats of the Oklahoma House of Representatives, 24 of 48 seats in the Oklahoma State Senate, and other local and municipal offices.

Oklahoma had a special election for retiring U.S. Senator Jim Inhofe's Senate seat.

Oklahoma primaries are closed primaries, meaning that only voters registered with a political party can vote in that party's primary. However, state law allows parties to 'open up' their primary and allow independent voters to participate in their primary if they file a notice with the State Election Board Secretary Paul Ziriax. The Democratic Party of Oklahoma filed to allow independent voters to participate in their primaries for 2022 and 2023. The Libertarian Party of Oklahoma filed notice it will hold closed primaries. The Republican Party of Oklahoma filed no notice, meaning it held closed primaries.

Federal offices

United States Class III Senate Seat

United States House of Representatives

Governor

Lieutenant Governor
Incumbent Lieutenant Governor Matt Pinnell won re-election.

General Election

Candidates
Melinda Alizadeh-Fard, attorney and former administrative law judge (Democratic)
Matt Pinnell, incumbent lieutenant governor (Republican)
Chris Powell, Bethany city councilor and nominee for governor in 2018 (Libertarian)

Endorsements

Polling

Results

Attorney General

State Auditor and Inspector
Since no Independent, Democratic, or Libertarian candidate filed for Oklahoma State Auditor and Inspector there was no general election. Instead, the winner of the Republican primary on June 28 would take office. Incumbent State Auditor Cindy Byrd won the Republican primary and her reelection on June 28, defeating primary challenger Steven McQuillen.

Republican primary

Candidates

Nominee
Cindy Byrd, incumbent state auditor

Eliminated in primary
Steven McQuillen, fixed asset accounting manager for Tulsa Public Schools (1998–present) and former auditor and treasurer of the Philippine American Association of North Eastern Oklahoma (2004-2006)

Endorsements

Polling

Results

State Superintendent
The incumbent Democratic Oklahoma State Superintendent of Public Instruction Joy Hofmeister, who was elected as a Republican, was term limited in 2022. Oklahoma Secretary of Education Ryan Walters won the election.

Republican primary

Nominee
Ryan Walters, Oklahoma Secretary of Education (2020–present)

Eliminated in runoff
April Grace, Superintendent of Shawnee Public Schools (2016–present)

Eliminated in primary
William Crozier, retired veteran and candidate for State Superintendent of Oklahoma in 2006.
John Cox, Superintendent of Peggs Public Schools (1999–present)

Declared, but failed to file
Jerry Griffin, Tulsa Public Schools board member for district 6 (ran for Tulsa city council)

Endorsements

Primary polling

Debate

Primary results

Runoff polling

Runoff results

General election

Candidates
Ryan Walters, Oklahoma Secretary of Education (2020–present) (Republican nominee)
Jena Nelson, Oklahoma Teacher of the Year (2020) and Deer Creek Middle School teacher (2017–present) (Democratic nominee)

Endorsements

Polling

Results

State Treasurer

Corporation Commissioner
The incumbent Republican Oklahoma Corporation Commissioner Dana Murphy is term limited in 2022.
Former State Senate Majority Leader Kim David won the election.

Republican primary

Nominee
Kim David, Majority Leader of the Oklahoma State Senate

Eliminated in runoff
Todd Thomsen, state representative (2006-2017)

Eliminated in primary
Justin Hornback, representative for the Pipeliners Union 798
Harold Spradling, candidate for Corporate Commissioner in 2018 and 2020

Endorsements

Polling

Debate

Primary results

Runoff polling

Runoff results

General election

Candidates
Kim David, Majority Leader of the Oklahoma State Senate (Republican)
Margaret Warigia Bowman, University of Tulsa College of Law professor specializing in water, energy, infrastructure and regulatory law (Democratic)
Don Underwood, Inola, Oklahoma resident (Independent)

Endorsements

Polling

Results

Commissioner of Labor
Incumbent Leslie Osborn won  reelection.

Republican primary

Nominee
Leslie Osborn, incumbent Oklahoma Commissioner of Labor

Eliminated in runoff
Sean Roberts, State Senator for the 36th district (2011–present)

Eliminated in primary
Keith Swinton, candidate for Commissioner of Labor in 2018 and project engineer for Ready Services, LLC

Endorsements

Polling

Results

Runoff polling

Runoff results

General election

Candidates
Leslie Osborn, incumbent Oklahoma Labor Commissioner (Republican nominee)
Will Daugherty, development manager at FirstLight Home Care (Libertarian nominee)
Jack Henderson, former Tulsa, Oklahoma city councilor for the 1st district (2004-2016) (Democratic nominee)

Endorsements

Polling

Results

Insurance Commissioner
Only one candidate filed for Oklahoma Insurance Commissioner, incumbent Glen Mulready. There was no election for this office in 2022, and Glen Mulready was re-elected without opposition.

State Legislature
All 101 seats of the Oklahoma House of Representatives and 24 of 48 seats of the Oklahoma State Senate were up for election.

State Senate

House of Representatives

Local elections
2022 Tulsa municipal elections
2022 Oklahoma City mayoral election
2022 Norman, Oklahoma mayoral election

Notes

References

 
Oklahoma